Waldorf Astoria New York is a historic Manhattan hotel built in 1931.

Waldorf–Astoria may also refer to: 
 Waldorf-Astoria (1893–1929), the predecessor of the current Waldorf Astoria New York
 Waldorf Astoria Hotels & Resorts, a hospitality hotel management firm
 Waldorf Astoria Berlin, a hotel in Berlin, Germany
 Waldorf Astoria Chicago, a hotel in Chicago, Illinois, USA
 Waldorf Astoria Edinburgh - The Caledonian, a hotel in Edinburgh, Scotland
 Waldorf-Astoria Hotel and Residence Tower, a proposed but cancelled Chicago skyscraper
 Waldorf Astoria Washington DC, which opened in 2022 in the Old Post Office building
 Waldorf-Astoria Cigar Company
 Waldorf-Astoria-Zigarettenfabrik (Cigarette factory), a former German tobacco company

See also
 Waldorf Hotel (disambiguation)
 Waldorf education
 William Waldorf Astor, hotel businessman for whom the hotel chain name was derived, great grandson of John Jacob Astor, born in Walldorf (now Germany), the first multi-millionaire in the United States.